Lee Sang-Min (born 14 September 1986 in Gangwon-do) is a South Korean footballer who most recently played for Gyeongnam FC.

Career

Gyeongnam FC
He began his senior career in one the top clubs in Brazil, the Coritiba Football Club. He made his debut at the age of 17 years old. His style of playing has been compared to PSG Brazilian midfielder Lucas Moura, with commentators praising strong, fast, technical skill with both legs.

He came back to Korea in 2008. Gyeongnam FC manager Cho Kwang-Rae wanted to contract with him, and the bid was successfully completed. Lee joined Gyeongnam FC with a new foreign player Almir and was given the number 30. He was evaluated and found to be a very good technician and hot-prospect player by his manager and coaches. He left the club in 2010 but returned four years later. As of 2017, he is not listed on any Club rosters.

External links
 

1986 births
Living people
South Korean footballers
South Korean expatriate footballers
Iraty Sport Club players
Coritiba Foot Ball Club players
Brusque Futebol Clube players
Gyeongnam FC players
Expatriate footballers in Brazil
Expatriate footballers in Indonesia
Expatriate footballers in Thailand
South Korean expatriate sportspeople in Brazil
South Korean expatriate sportspeople in Indonesia
South Korean expatriate sportspeople in Thailand
K League 1 players
Liga 1 (Indonesia) players
Association football midfielders
Lee Sang-min